Miroljub Lešo (27 June 1946 – 5 March 2019) was a Yugoslav and Serbian actor. He appeared in more than ninety films since 1968. Lešo played the role of Slavko in the television series Otpisani. He was born and died in Belgrade.

Filmography

References

External links 

1946 births
2019 deaths
Male actors from Belgrade
Serbian male film actors